The 1888 Detroit Wolverines finished the season with a 68–63 record, finishing in fifth place in the National League. After the season, the ownership, having lost so much money on the team, disbanded the team and sold off the players.

Regular season

Season standings

Record vs. opponents

Roster

Player stats

Batting

Starters by position 
Note: Pos = Position; G = Games played; AB = At bats; H = Hits; Avg. = Batting average; HR = Home runs; RBI = Runs batted in

Other batters 
Note: G = Games played; AB = At bats; H = Hits; Avg. = Batting average; HR = Home runs; RBI = Runs batted in

Pitching

Starting pitchers 
Note: G = Games pitched; IP = Innings pitched; W = Wins; L = Losses; ERA = Earned run average; SO = Strikeouts

Relief pitchers 
Note: G = Games pitched; W = Wins; L = Losses; SV = Saves; ERA = Earned run average; SO = Strikeouts

References 
1888 Detroit Wolverines season at Baseball Reference

Detroit Wolverines seasons
Detroit Wolverines season
Detroit Wolverines
1880s in Detroit